The 1956 Tasmanian state election was held on 13 October 1956  in the Australian state of Tasmania to elect 30 members of the Tasmanian House of Assembly. The election used the Hare-Clark proportional representation system — six members were elected from each of five electorates.

Background
The 1955 election had resulted in a parliamentary deadlock between the Labor and Liberal parties, although Robert Cosgrove remained Premier of Tasmania. On 11 September 1956, Cosgrove's minister for housing, Carrol Bramich, resigned from the ALP following an internal row, party switching and giving the Liberal opposition a majority. Cosgrove obtained a dissolution of parliament from the Governor of Tasmania, and an election was called for 13 October.

The electorate of Darwin had been renamed in 1955 to Braddon, after former Premier Sir Edward Braddon.

Results

Following the 1956 election, the ALP and Liberals remained in a 15-seat deadlock. Despite Bramich's defection to the Liberals, Labor picked up a seat in Bramich's electorate of Braddon, maintaining the status quo with Cosgrove and the ALP still in power.

|}

Distribution of votes

Primary vote by division

Distribution of seats

Aftermath
The subsequent election in 1959 saw the number of seats in the Tasmanian House of Assembly increased to 35, which would prevent the kind of deadlock which resulted from having an even number of seats in the house.

See also
 Members of the Tasmanian House of Assembly, 1956–1959
 Candidates of the 1956 Tasmanian state election

References

External links
Assembly Election Results, 1956, Parliament of Tasmania.
Report on Parliamentary Elections, 1956, Tasmanian Electoral Commission.

Elections in Tasmania
1956 elections in Australia
1950s in Tasmania
October 1956 events in Australia